Joan Salvato Wulff (born 1926) is a fly fisher, author and educator, also known as the "First Lady of Fly Fishing." In 1951, she won the national fly-casting distance title by winning the all-male competition and was a National Casting Champion from 1943-1960. She started the Wulff School of Fly Fishing along with her husband, Lee Wulff, in 1978, along the Beaverkill River in New York. The author of numerous books, Wulff was inducted into the International Game Fish Association Hall of Fame (2007) and American Casting Association Hall of Fame and is widely regarded as the architect of modern-day fly-casting mechanics.

Early life and angling career 
Joan Wulff was born in Paterson, New Jersey. Throughout her childhood, she recalls that family life revolved to a large extent around her brothers' and father's interests in fishing and hunting, as well as the family's local outfitting shop, Paterson Rod & Gun. Her long-standing passion for angling is said to have originated from her exposure to fishing at a young age.

In her book, Joan Wulff's New Fly Casting Techniques, she describes her early exposure to fishing and how it sparked her interest in the sport: "I became hooked on fishing at the age of five or six, accompanying my parents one bass-fishing evening. Dad fished with a fly rod; mother rowed the boat. Things came together and a bass exploded from under the lily pads to take Dad's bass bug. The bass and I got hooked at the same time."

At age 10, Wulff asked her mother if she could borrow a bamboo fly rod belonging to her father, whom she claimed she admired. After a few attempts at casting, the rod came apart at the ferrule, and the top section slid into the water. Fearing her father's reaction, she and her mother summoned a neighbor to retrieve it with a rake. When Wulff’s father found out what had happened, far from being angry, he bought Joan a rod of her own, and showed her how to use it.

After her first fly-casting lessons from her father, she further developed her technique under the guidance of mentor William Taylor and instructors at the Paterson New Jersey Casting Club. Within two years, Wulff was the New Jersey Sub-Junior All Around Casting Champion. It was claimed that even with her 5-foot stature, she could cast a 5-weight fly rod single-handedly, hitting targets 50 feet away. Wulff enjoyed testing her mettle against male contestants, and used strategies such as shifting her weight and lengthening strokes with her body to improve her cast. Al Ristori, a New Jersey outdoor writer who frequented Paterson Rod & Gun during his childhood, remarked that “she could outcast just about any man." In the 1930s, distance and accuracy casting was a popular sport, and her father Jimmy Salvato — a New Jersey game and fish commissioner and outdoors writer — was one of the best. At 16, Joan was crowned New Jersey State Champion, and competed in her first national championship, in Chicago. With her Scottish-born mother, Alexina Sampson Salvato, providing emotional support, Wulff won the first of what became 17 national titles from 1943 to 1960.

Between 1943 and 1960, Wulff traveled the country, driving to casting competitions and outdoors shows, while achieving milestones and popularity. In 1945, American Magazine published a story about her, “No Flies on Joanie,” and she was featured on the cover of Pennsylvania Angler. In 1947, she scored 99 out of 100 points at a national accuracy championship. That year, she achieved a personal best with a 120-foot cast in one of her first distance-casting contests. Four years later, she gathered further interest from the sporting community when she took the National Fisherman’s Distance Fly title with a 9-weight rod against an all-male field with a record (for a woman) cast of 131 feet. World champion fly caster Steve Rajeff provided insight on the event, stating that, “any time a female can achieve the record distance of a man takes tremendous skill...Joan was fantastic. Her records inspired this generation of women casters.”

Wulff's road trips continued. In addition to competitive distance casting (spinning and plug, as well as fly), she was known for trick casting. With a fly rod, she sliced bananas, broke balloons, even snapped a cigarette from the mouth of emcee Johnny Carson on the television game show Who Do You Trust? In the 1960 New Jersey State Casting Championship, Wulff performed a 161-foot cast that would have been a record for women if this cast was a Championship category.

Joan first interacted with Lee Wulff, a famous angler and cinematographer, filming together. Later, the two were married in 1967, traveling and fishing across the world together. This period of time included both Joan's introduction to salmon fishing, but also her extensive promotion of women's fishing clothing and equipment.

Wulff School of Fly Fishing 
In 1978, Joan and her husband Lee Wulff, moved to Lew Beach, New York, and the upper Beaverkill River, where Joan carried out her plan of opening a fly-fishing school. Teaching was a shared passion for the Wulffs, something they had done sporadically before opening the school. Joan created a curriculum and terms that broke the cast into parts. A distinguished fly instructor, Brandt, explained that “she coined the term ‘power snap’ as a description for ending the stroke to form the loop and ‘drift’ to describe the follow-through of the back cast and repositioning of the rod between the back and forward strokes. Technically, she’s the most proficient caster I’ve ever seen. And a master teacher." Miami-based master instructor Chico Fernandez similarly mentioned that, “she can correct casting subtleties in people at the highest level, and with the same focus and contribution, help beginners.”

After the death of Lee Wulff in April 1991, Joan was grief-stricken and concerned about the future of the school in Lee's absence. Wulff remained adamant that her school would remain. At this time, friends were providing support, including one of Lee’s closest, lawyer Ted Rogowski of the Environmental Protection Agency. Robert Redford’s film A River Runs Through It was released the year after Lee’s death, and its impact on the school was profound. Numbers of women filled all 10 sessions, with a newfound interest in fly-fishing. Many students seemed to hold Wulff and her instructional skills in high regard. One former student and professional guide, Lori Ann Murphy, admiringly referred to Wulff as "grace, beauty and intelligence all in motion."

With this increase in female students, Wulff hired protégé and nurse practitioner Sheila Hassan of Boston to instruct alongside her. Hassan joined the school in 2003 and became chief instructor in 2008. Hassan additionally commented that "when it comes to the mechanics of the cast, no one has risen to Joan’s level of detail", and that “at a time when so many people are retiring, it’s inspiring to see Joan teaching at such a high level... The way she can look at someone’s cast and identify how to improve, it is amazing. She’s a one-in-a-million teacher.”

Editorial and publishing career 
In the 1980s, Wulff took the opportunity to begin a casting column in Fly Rod & Reel magazine that ran for 22 years. After encouragement from Lee Wulff and publisher Nick Lyons, Wulff also wrote a book on fly-casting. When writing this new book, Wulff's goal was to explain the cast in terms that a novice could grasp. 

During one off-season in Florida, Wulff increased her focus on an explicit, stepwise method for fly-casting that would be appropriate for readers. Apparently, Lee would constantly challenge her for better explanations. Wulff's book took two years to complete with these goals in mind, including coining terms that described the cast. “Loading move,” for example, describes the first part of the stroke and “power snap” refers to the end of it. In this writing she wanted to address the physicality of casting, describing muscle movements as well. Finally, Joan Wulff’s Fly-Casting Techniques, was first published in 1987. With its pioneering casting mechanics, the book was received positively by magazine editors, students and professionals as a classic that made fly-casting accessible to everyone. It has been acclaimed as one of the best fly-casting instructional books ever written. Joan Wulff’s New Fly-Casting Techniques was published in 2012, subsequently followed by a second edition in 2016. Her instructional video, Dynamics of Fly Casting, accompanies Wulff's books in appraisal.

Royal Wulff Products 
Wulff co-founded Royal Wulff Products in the 1980s with husband Lee Wulff. As an avid fisherman and inventor, Lee had previously pioneered many firsts in the world of angling, including the invention of the pocketed fly-fishing vest in 1931, and the use of long-lasting animal hair (rather than chicken feathers) in heavier-bodied dry fly patterns such as the Royal Wulff. Lee Wulff also pioneered hook-embedded polystyrene fly bodies. With these Form-A-Lure flies, traditional feathers and hair were embedded in the plastic, simplifying conventional fly making. 

Presently, Royal Wulff Products specializes in offering innovative products for angling including unique tackle, fly lines, backing, fluorocarbon leaders and tippet material, fly line dressing, instructional materials, casting aids, and limited-quantity custom-made bamboo fly rods.

Present day 
Wulff continues to operate the Wulff School of Fly Fishing as both a mentor and teacher. When not traveling, Wulff offers personal instruction to students at the school, located in the Catskill Mountains (the purported birthplace of dry-fly fishing in America on the Beaverkill River). The Wulff School resides on 100 acres in the upper Beaverkill Valley with an adjoining private stretch of the Beaver Kill used to teach wading, stream craft, and obstacle casting. 

Royal Wulff Products, which Wulff co-founded, is now run by her son, Douglas Cummings.

References

External links 

 Joan Salvato Wulff Papers, General Collection, Beinecke Rare Book and Manuscript Library, Yale University.

1920s births
Living people
American fishers
American sportswriters
People from Paterson, New Jersey